The Hailemariam and Roman Foundation is a non-profit organization based in Addis Ababa, Ethiopia. The foundation was established in April 2018 by former Ethiopian Prime Minister Hailemariam Desalegn and former First Lady Roman Tesfaye. The foundation's programs are focused on improving the health and nutrition of young children and mothers, as well as transforming the tourism and conservation of selected national parks in the most remote areas of Ethiopia.

Co-founder, Hailemariam Desalegn, said the foundation will give priority to Afar, Southern Nations, Nationalities, and Peoples' Region, Benishangul-Gumuz and Gambella states.

History 

Hailemariam submitted his resignation as Prime Minister of Ethiopia and  chairperson  of Ethiopian People's Revolutionary Democratic Front (EPRDF) on 15 February 2018. His resignation was accepted on 11 March 2018, and remained in office as caretaker Prime Minister until 2 April 2018.

In April 2018, the foundation was launched as an international NGO in an agreement reached with the Government of the Federal Democratic Republic of Ethiopia. On October 16, 2020, the foundation received accreditation from the Ethiopian Civil Society Organizations Agency.

Financial support 
On October 6, 2020, the foundation received 3.2 million birr of funding from the federal government of Japan for the construction of a public library in Gatchno Kebele, an area within the Wolayita Zone.

References

External links 
 Official website

2018 establishments in Ethiopia
Foundations based in Ethiopia
Organisations based in Addis Ababa
International nongovernmental organizations